The 2009 WNBA Season was the 13th season of the Women's National Basketball Association. It is the first WNBA season without a Houston franchise, the Comets having folded in December 2008. The season ended with the Phoenix Mercury winning their second championship in three years.

The regular season began with a televised (ABC) meeting between the defending champion Detroit Shock and the Los Angeles Sparks in Los Angeles on June 6. The Connecticut Sun hosted the 9th Annual All-Star Game which was broadcast live on ABC (HD) on July 25.

2008/2009 WNBA offseason

The new television deal with ESPN will begin during the 2009 season. For the first time ever, teams will be paid rights fees as part of this deal.
As of the 2009 season, the maximum roster size per team is reduced from 13 to 11. Any team that falls below nine players able to play due to injury, pregnancy or any other factor outside of the control of the team will, upon request, be granted a roster hardship exception allowing the team to sign an additional player or players so that the team will have nine players able to play in an upcoming game or games. As soon as the injured (or otherwise sidelined) player(s) is able to play, the roster hardship player(s) -- not any other player on the roster—must be waived.
On October 23, 2008, Angela Taylor was named general manager of the Washington Mystics.
On November 6, 2008, Julie Plank was named head coach of the Washington Mystics.
On November 20, 2008, Bill Laimbeer was signed to a two-year contract extension as the head coach and general manager of the Detroit Shock.
On December 1, 2008, the Houston Comets ceased basketball operations.
On January 5, 2009, the free agent signing period began.
On February 3, 2009, president Donna Orender announced that the 2009 WNBA All-Star Game is in Connecticut, hosted by the Sun.
On April 28, 2009, Anne Donovan was named assistant coach of the New York Liberty.
The WNBA announced the addition of the WNBA LiveAccess system on May 13, 2009. This new feature on WNBA.com will provide fans with free access to more than 200 live game webcasts – the league's most comprehensive offering – throughout the 2009 WNBA season. For the first time, fans around the world will be able to access live game webcasts on individual team web sites. All of the WNBA LiveAccess games will then be archived for on-demand viewing.
On June 1, 2009, Donna Orender and David Stern announced that the Phoenix Mercury had signed a corporate deal with LifeLock. This would allow the LifeLock name to be on the team uniforms and the court, among other things. This was the first deal of the type in WNBA or NBA history.
On June 3, 2009, Minnesota Lynx head coach Don Zierden resigned to take an assistant job with Flip Saunders and the Washington Wizards. Assistant coach Jennifer Gillom was promoted to head coach of the Lynx.
On June 5, 2009, the Los Angeles Sparks signed a corporate deal with Farmers Insurance. This would allow the Farmers Insurance name to be on the team uniforms and the court, among other things. This was the second deal of the type in WNBA or NBA history (after the Mercury).

Houston Comets dispersal draft
On December 8, 2008, the Houston Comets dispersal draft was held. Five former Comets players, Latasha Byears, Mwadi Mabika, Hamchetou Maiga-Ba, Michelle Snow and Tina Thompson were free agents and therefore not eligible for this draft. Teams selected based inversely on their 2008 regular season records.

The top picks were:
Sancho Lyttle, Atlanta Dream
Matee Ajavon, Washington Mystics
Mistie Bass, Chicago Sky

Six of the thirteen teams making selections waived their picks.

2009 WNBA Draft

The WNBA Draft lottery was held on December 9, 2008. The Atlanta Dream received the first overall selection. The Washington Mystics received the number two selection. The Chicago Sky came up with the third overall selection, followed by the Minnesota Lynx at four and the Phoenix Mercury at number five. For the first time in WNBA history, the lottery balls were chosen exactly according to odds.

The 2009 WNBA Draft was held on April 9 in Secaucus, New Jersey. Coverage of the first round was shown on ESPN2 (in HD for the first time ever) at 3:00pm. Second and third round coverage was shown on ESPNU and NBA TV at 4:00pm.

The top draft picks were as follows:
Angel McCoughtry, Atlanta Dream
Marissa Coleman, Washington Mystics
Kristi Toliver, Chicago Sky
Renee Montgomery, Minnesota Lynx
DeWanna Bonner, Phoenix Mercury

Regular season

Standings

All-Star Game

The 2009 WNBA All-Star Game was hosted by the Connecticut Sun on July 25 at Mohegan Sun Arena. Coverage of the game began at 3:30pm on ABC. This marked the second time the Sun had hosted the annual event.

Statistic leaders
The following shows the leaders for each statistic during the 2009 regular season.

Schedule

|-
| rowspan=2|Thu April 9 || 3:00 ||colspan=3| 2009 WNBA draft: First round ||colspan=5| ESPN2 (HD) || Secaucus, New Jersey
|-
| 4:00 ||colspan=3| 2009 WNBA draft: Later rounds ||colspan=5| ESPNU, NBA TV || Secaucus, New Jersey 
|-
| rowspan=2|Thu May 21 || 11:00am || Washington || @ || New York ||  || 77-71NYL || Sanford (17) || Sanford (8) || Carson (4) || Madison Square Garden  15,958
|-
| 10:00 || Sacramento || @ || Seattle ||  || 64-55SEA || Powell (15) || 5 players (5) || Atkinson (4) || KeyArena  4,875
|-
| rowspan=2|Fri May 22 || 7:00 || New York || @ || Connecticut ||  || 74-62CON || Jones (11) || Black (7) || 4 players (3) || Mohegan Sun Arena  5,578
|-
| 8:30 || Detroit || @ || Chicago ||  || 71-67CHI || Fowles (21)|| Miller (10) || DeLaHoussaye,Perkins (5) || UIC Pavilion  3,283
|-
| rowspan=1|Sat May 23 || 1:00 || Indiana || @ || Minnesota ||  || 68-51IND || Douglas (19) || Pringle (6) || Catchings, January, Montgomery (3) || Claire Lynch Hall  475
|-
| rowspan=3|Wed May 27 || 11:00am || Chicago || @ || Detroit ||  || 78-68DET || Zellous (18) || Zellous (8) || Smith (5)  || Palace of Auburn Hills  3,952
|-
| 2:00 || Phoenix || @ || Sacramento ||  || 74-70PHO || Quigley (15) || Harper (9) || Quigley (4) || ARCO Arena  6,339
|-
| 7:30 || Connecticut || @ || Atlanta ||  || 76-73ATL || Phillips (18) || de Souza (9) || Teasley (7) || Philips Arena  4,980
|-
| rowspan=2|Thu May 28 || 11:30am || New York || @ || Washington ||  || 74-56WAS || Ajavon (17) || Vaughn (7) || Ajavon (3) || Verizon Center  9,287
|-
| 7:00 || Chicago || @ || Indiana ||  || 74-67IND || Douglas, Dupree, Chen (15) || Ely (8) || Dupree (3) || Conseco Fieldhouse  6,457
|-
| rowspan=2|Sat May 30 || 7:00 || San Antonio || @ || Detroit ||  || 62-55DET || Young (14) || Mattera (8) || Johnson (4) || Traverse City West H.S.  2,109
|-
| 10:00 || Seattle || @ || Phoenix ||  || 61-58PHO || Wright (16) || Walker (12) || Pondexter (6) || US Airways Center  2,421
|-
| rowspan=1|Sun May 31 || 3:00 || Los Angeles || @ || Connecticut ||  || 80-77LAS || Thompson (14) || Littles (8) || Lennox (4) || Mohegan Sun Arena  6,630
|-
| rowspan=2|Tue June 2 || 8:00 || E-League || @ || Chicago ||  || 102-55CHI || Dupree (20) || Alexander (8) || Toliver (6) || UIC Pavilion  3,488
|-
| 10:00 || Indiana || @ || San Antonio ||  || 67-60IND || Catchings (16) || Frazee (8) || Catchings (4) || Austin Convention Center 

|-
! style="background:#094480; color:white" | 2009 WNBA Regular Season
|-

|-
| rowspan=6|Sat 6 || 2:30 || Detroit || @ || Los Angeles || ABC (HD) || 78-58LAS || Thompson (18) || Lennox (10) || Harrower (7) || Staples Center  13,154
|-
| 4:00 || Seattle || @ || Sacramento ||  || 71-61SEA || Jackson (23) || Harper, Little (6) || Bird (8) || ARCO Arena  14,824
|- 
| 4:00 || Washington || @ || Connecticut ||  || 82-70WAS || Jones (22) || Sanford, Langhorne (7) || Harding (7) || Mohegan Sun Arena  7,191 
|- 
| 7:00 || Indiana || @ || Atlanta ||  || 87-86 (2OT)ATL || Holdsclaw (23) || de Souza (17) || January (5) || Philips Arena  8,709 
|- 
| 8:00 || Chicago || @ || Minnesota || NBA TVFSN-N || 102-85MIN || Perkins (24) || Perkins (6) || Anosike (8) || Target Center  8,708
|- 
| 10:00 || San Antonio || @ ||Phoenix || NBA TVKMYS || 90-79PHO || Taurasi, Young (25) || Riley (13) || Johnson (9) || US Airways Center  13,582 
|- 
| rowspan=4|Sun 7 || 4:00 || Connecticut || @ ||New York || WCTX || 66-57CON || Whalen (14) || Whalen (12) || Battle, Mitchell (3) || Madison Square Garden  13,397
|- 
| 4:00 || Atlanta || @ ||Washington ||  || 77-71WAS || Beard (27) || Langhorne (8) || Harding (7) || Verizon Center  11,759
|- 
| 7:00 || Minnesota || @ ||Indiana || FSI || 96-74MIN || Houston (23) || Griffith (7) || Houston, White (4) || Conseco Fieldhouse  9,234
|- 
| 9:00 || Sacramento || @ ||Seattle || FSN-NW || 80-70SEA || Jackson (25) || Powell, Lawson (7) || Bird (8) || KeyArena  9,686
|- 
| rowspan=1|Mon 8 || 7:30 || Los Angeles || @ ||Detroit ||  || 81-52DET || Nolan (27) || Thompson (11) || 5 players (3) || Palace of Auburn Hills  13,915
|- 
| rowspan=1|Tue 9 || 7:00 || Seattle || @ ||Indiana || ESPN2 (HD) || 73-66IND || Jackson (21) || Sutton-Brown (10) || Bird (5) || Conseco Fieldhouse  7,253
|- 
| rowspan=3|Wed 10 || 7:30 || Washington || @ ||Detroit ||  || 75-69WAS || Beard (15) || Melvin (9) || Nolan (6) || Palace of Auburn Hills  7,329
|- 
| 8:00 || Los Angeles || @ ||Minnesota ||  || 87-76MIN || Augustus (30) || Augustus (9) || Anosike, Miller (5) || Target Center  7,444
|- 
| 10:00 || New York || @ ||Phoenix ||  || 91-84PHO || Pondexter (26) || Kraayeveld, Vaughn (7) || McCarville (6) || US Airways Center  5,080
|- 
| rowspan=4|Fri 12 || 7:00 || Los Angeles || @ ||Indiana ||  || 73-61IND || Leslie (21) || Leslie (13) || Catchings, Douglas (5) || Conseco Fieldhouse  9,320
|- 
| 8:00 || Seattle || @ ||Minnesota ||  || 88-71SEA || Jackson (22) || Jackson (11) || Bird (9) || Target Center  6,423
|- 
| 8:30 || Atlanta || @ ||Chicago || NBA TVCN100 || 81-73CHI || Dupree (23) || de Souza, Dupree (8) || Perkins (8) || UIC Pavilion  5,689
|- 
| 10:00 || Phoenix || @ ||Sacramento ||  || 90-71SAC || Powell (19) || Harper, Paris (8) || Lawson, Pondexter (4) || ARCO Arena  6,438
|- 
| rowspan=2|Sat 13 || 8:00 || New York || @ ||San Antonio || NBA TVMSGKMYS || 63-60SAN || Christon (21) || McCarville (9) || Hammon (4) || AT&T Center  10,572
|- 
| 10:00 || Sacramento || @ ||Phoenix ||  || 115-104 (OT)PHO || Taurasi (31) || Powell (9) || Johnson, Lawson (8) || US Airways Center  7,173
|- 
| rowspan=2|Sun 14 || 3:00 || Atlanta || @ ||Connecticut ||  || 67-62ATL || Lyttle (20) || Lyttle (15) || Teasley, Whalen (5) || Mohegan Sun Arena  6,429
|- 
| 6:00 || Seattle || @ ||Chicago ||  || 64-57CHI || Jackson (22) || Fowles (15) || Wright (4) || UIC Pavilion  2,681
|- 
| rowspan=2|Tue 16 || 8:00 || Connecticut || @ ||Chicago ||  || 78-75CHI || Perkins (25) || Fowles (10) || Whalen (8) || UIC Pavilion  2,396
|- 
| 10:00 || Minnesota || @ ||Sacramento || || 86-83MIN || Augustus (30) || Harper (9) || Wiggins (6) || ARCO Arena  7,736
|- 
| rowspan=1|Wed 17 || 10:00 || Minnesota || @ ||Phoenix ||  || 104-80PHO || Taurasi (28) || Anosike, Bonner (10) || Pondexter (9) || US Airways Center  6,524
|- 
| rowspan=6|Fri 19 || 7:00 || Chicago || @ ||Connecticut ||  || 91-61CON || Jones (17) || Gardin (11) || Gardin (7) || Mohegan Sun Arena  5,892
|- 
| 7:30 || San Antonio || @ ||New York || NBA TVMSG || 77-61NYL || McCarville (18) || Young (7) || Christon (6) || Madison Square Garden  8,046
|- 
| 7:30 || Indiana || @ ||Detroit ||  || 66-54IND || Catchings (15) || Hornbuckle, McWilliams (10) || Catchings (4) || Palace of Auburn Hills  7,725
|- 
| 7:30 || Washington || @ ||Atlanta ||  || 93-81ATL || Beard, Lyttle (20) || Lyttle (13) || Currie, Hardin (7) || Philips Arena  6,050
|- 
| 10:00 || Los Angeles || @ ||Phoenix || || 89-80PHO || Pondexter (21) || Thompson (14) || Johnson (7) || US Airways Center  8,255
|- 
| 10:00 || Minnesota || @ ||Seattle ||  || 90-62SEA || Jackson (26) || Anosike (7) || Bird (10) || KeyArena  7,607
|- 
| rowspan=1|Sat 20 || 7:00 || Chicago || @ ||Washington ||  || 81-72WAS || Beard (31) || Melvin (9) || Perkins (6) || Verizon Center  11,745
|- 
| rowspan=5|Sun 21 || 3:00 || San Antonio || @ ||Connecticut || NBA TVWCTX || 71-58CON || Young (22) || Black (8) || Darling (4) || Mohegan Sun Arena  6,928
|- 
| 3:00 || New York || @ ||Atlanta ||  || 93-81NYL || Christon, Holdsclaw (17) || Lyttle (9) || Moore (8) || Philips Arena  5,624
|- 
| 6:00 || Detroit || @ ||Indiana || NBA TVFSI || 82-70IND || Douglas (23) || Sutton-Brown (9) || Catchings, Nolan (6) || Conseco Fieldhouse  7,610
|- 
| 7:00 || Seattle || @ ||Phoenix || NBA TVFSNA || 93-84SEA || Jackson, Taurasi (25) || Jackson (8) || Bird (9) || US Airways Center  6,181
|- 
| 9:30 || Sacramento || @ ||Los Angeles || NBA TVFSNW || 67-47LAS || Powell (13) || Walker (9) || Bobbitt (5) || Staples Center  9,494
|- 
| rowspan=3|Tue 23 || 12:00 || Chicago || @ ||Atlanta ||  || 99-98 (OT)CHI || McCoughtry (26) || Dupree (10) || McCoughtry (8) || Philips Arena  10,351
|- 
| 9:30 || Phoenix || @ ||San Antonio || ESPN2 (HD) || 91-87SAN || Pondexter (26) || Taurasi, Young (8) || Johnson, Young (5) || AT&T Center  6,692
|- 
| 8:00 || New York || @ ||Minnesota ||  || 69-57MIN || Christon, Wiggins (25) || Hollingsworth (7) || Wiggins (5) || Target Center  5,620
|- 
| rowspan=1|Thu 25 || 7:00 || Phoenix || @ ||Washington ||  || 93-87PHO || Pondexter (24) || Langhorne (12) || Harding (9) || Verizon Center  9,808
|- 
| rowspan=4|Fri 26 || 7:00 || Indiana || @ ||New York ||  || 82-81 (OT)IND || Douglas (24) || Hoffman (14) || L. Moore (6) || Madison Square Garden  9,304
|- 
| 7:30 || Detroit || @ ||Atlanta ||  || 96-86ATL || Holdsclaw (28) || de Souza (13) || Teasley (11) || Philips Arena  5,935
|- 
| 8:00 || Sacramento || @ ||San Antonio || || 62-52SAN || Hammon (26) || Young (10) || Hammon (6) || AT&T Center  7,973
|- 
| 10:00 || Los Angeles || @ ||Seattle ||  || 69-67SEA || Jackson (32) || Jackson, Wright (8) || Bird, Lennox (5) || KeyArena  9,686
|- 
| rowspan=4|Sat 27 || 7:00 || Atlanta || @ ||Connecticut ||  || 82-68CON || Jones (24) || Jones (12) || Whalen (5) || Mohegan Sun Arena  6,264
|- 
| 7:00 || New York || @ ||Indiana || MSG || 63-54IND || Carson, Hoffman (14) || Catchings (11) || Catchings (4) || Conseco Fieldhouse  8,481
|- 
| 8:00 || Phoenix || @ ||Minnesota || NBA TVFSN-NFSNA || 109-80MIN || Hodges, Wiggins (22) || Anosike, Taurasi (8) || Miller (8) || Target Center  5,911
|- 
| 8:00 || Washington || @ ||Chicago ||  || 68-63CHI || Dupree (23) || Fowles (10) || Harding (6) || UIC Pavilion  3,918
|- 
| rowspan=2|Sun 28 || 6:00 || Sacramento || @ ||Detroit ||  || 86-72DET || Zellous (18) || Ford (8) || Penicheiro (5) || Palace of Auburn Hills  7,277
|- 
| 9:30 || Seattle || @ ||Los Angeles || NBA TVFSNW || 82-55LAS || Ferdinand-Harris (15) || Cash (5) || Harrower (5) || Staples Center  10,797
|- 
| rowspan=3|Tue 30 || 7:00 || Minnesota || @ ||Atlanta || ESPN2 (HD) || 91-85MIN || Castro Marques (31) || Anosike (12) || Anosike, Houston, Lehning, Wiggins (4) || Philips Arena  7,686
|- 
| 8:00 || Washington || @ ||San Antonio ||  || 84-82WAS || Young (21) || Currie (8) || Darling (6) || AT&T Center  4,723
|- 
| 8:00 || Sacramento || @ ||Chicago ||  || 74-72CHI || Powell (21) || Fowles (14) || Perkins (8) || UIC Pavilion  2,721
|-

|-
| rowspan=1|Wed 1 || 10:00 || Seattle || @ ||Phoenix || || 91-83PHO || Pondexter, Taurasi (22) || Pondexter (11) || Pondexter (8) || US Airways Center  6,341
|-
| rowspan=3|Thu 2 || 7:00 || Connecticut || @ ||Indiana || NBA TVFSI || 67-53IND || Douglas, Sutton-Brown (14) || Sutton-Brown (14) || Catchings (5) || Conseco Fieldhouse  6,468
|- 
| 7:30 || Detroit || @ ||New York || NBA TVMSG || 80-64NYL || Christon (25) || Ford, Hornbuckle (10) || McCarville, Smith (5) || Madison Square Garden  8,018
|- 
| 8:00 || Sacramento || @ ||Minnesota || FSN-N || 74-68SAC || Powell (21) || Anosike, Brunson (8) || Anosike (7) || Target Center  6,920
|-
| rowspan=2|Fri 3 || 7:30 || Washington || @ ||Atlanta || || 72-65ATL || Holdsclaw (18) || Melvin (9) || Holdsclaw (8) || Philips Arena  5,456
|- 
| 8:00 || Chicago || @ ||San Antonio ||  || 85-72SAN || Young (19) || Riley, Young (8) || Hammon (10) || AT&T Center  6,662
|- 
| rowspan=3|Sun 5 || 6:00 || Connecticut || @ ||Detroit || || 95-92 (OT)CON || Smith (28) || Hornbuckle (12) || Jones, McWilliams (5) || Palace of Auburn Hills  6,981
|- 
| 6:00 || Atlanta || @ ||Indiana ||  || 78-74IND || Sutton-Brown (22) || Catchings, Sutton-Brown (9) || Catchings (5) || Conseco Fieldhouse  7,024
|- 
| 9:30 || Phoenix || @ ||Los Angeles || NBA TVFSNWFSNA || 104-89PHO || Pondexter (21) || Bonner (10) || Bobbitt, Taurasi (6) || Staples Center  9,872
|-
| rowspan=4|Tue 7 || 3:00 || San Antonio || @ ||Seattle || || 66-53SEA || Cash (18) || Cash, Jackson (12) || Hammon (5) || KeyArena  10,137
|- 
| 7:30 || Connecticut || @ ||Atlanta ||  || 72-67ATL || Holdsclaw (19) || de Souza (17) || Lehning (7) || Philips Arena  6,225
|- 
| 8:00 || Washington || @ ||Minnesota ||  || 96-94 (OT)MIN || Harding (27) || Currie (11) || Anosike, Currie, Miller (4) || Target Center  7,171
|-
| 10:00 || Chicago || @ ||Sacramento ||  || 83-73SAC || Perkins (21) || Brunson (10) || Lawson, Penicheiro, Perkins (6) || ARCO Arena  5,672
|-
| rowspan=1|Wed 8 || 10:00 || Chicago || @ ||Phoenix ||  || 90-70PHO || Dupree, Taurasi (22) || T. Smith (13) || Pondexter (6) || US Airways Center  5,597
|-
| rowspan=2|Thu 9 || 7:30 || Los Angeles || @ ||New York || MSG || 69-60LAS || Lennox (20) || Thompson (8) || Harrower, Ferdinand-Harris, McCarville (3) || Madison Square Garden  12,247
|- 
| 9:00 || Sacramento || @ || Seattle || ESPN2 (HD) || 66-55SEA || Cash (18) || Powell (8) || Wright (7) || KeyArena  6,838
|- 
| rowspan=2|Fri 10 || 8:00 || San Antonio || @ ||Minnesota ||  || 77-61SAN || Young (21) || Anosike (12) || Lawson-Wade (4) || Target Center  7,409
|- 
| 8:30 || Indiana || @ ||Chicago ||  || 83-54IND || Murphy (15) || Dupree (8) || Hoffman, January (6) || UIC Pavilion  4,021
|- 
| rowspan=4|Sat 11 || 7:00 || Los Angeles || @ ||Washington || || 75-63WAS || Beard (26) || Langhorne (11) || Harding (5) || Verizon Center  12,217
|- 
| 7:00 || Detroit || @ ||Connecticut || NBA TVWCTX || 79-77 (OT)DET || Smith (25) || Braxton (13) || Smith, Whalen (3) || Mohegan Sun Arena  6,342
|- 
| 7:30 || Atlanta || @ ||New York ||  || 71-69NYL || Castro Marques, Christon (18) || Castro Marques, de Souza, Holdsclaw (8) || Castro Marques, Moore (6) || Madison Square Garden  8,732
|-
| 10:00 || Phoenix || @ ||Sacramento ||  || 107-105PHO || Pondexter, Powell (23) || Bonner, Brunson, Taurasi, Walker (8) || Pondexter (8) || ARCO Arena  7,798
|-
| rowspan=2|Sun 12 || 7:00 || Minnesota || @ ||San Antonio || NBA TVKMYS || 83-76MIN || Hammon, Houston (26) || Anosike, Houston, Young (8) || Hammon (5) || AT&T Center  6,568
|- 
| 9:00 || Chicago || @ ||Seattle || NBA TVFSN-NW || 86-81CHI || Dupree (28) || Dupree, Jackson, Wright (7) || Toliver, Wright (7) || KeyArena  6,796
|- 
| rowspan=1|Tue 14 || 7:00 || Los Angeles || @ ||Connecticut || ESPN2 (HD) || 82-71CON || Jones (24) || Lennox (11) || Jones, Whalen (5) || Mohegan Sun Arena  6,612
|-
| rowspan=5|Wed 15 || 11:30am || San Antonio || @ ||Washington ||  || 79-78SAN || Hammon (21) || Beard, Frazee, Langhorne (6) || Darling, Hammon (5) || Verizon Center  17,220
|- 
| 1:00 || Atlanta || @ ||Minnesota || NBA TVFSN-N || 91-77ATL || Holdsclaw (28) || Houston (12) || Montgomery (7) || Target Center  11,245
|- 
| 1:00 || Chicago || @ ||Indiana ||  || 84-74IND || Sutton-Brown (22) || Dupree (10) || Catchings, Douglas (8) || Conseco Fieldhouse  10,050
|-
| 3:30 || Sacramento || @ ||Phoenix || NBA TVFSNA || 100-81PHO || Powell (23) || Paris (9) || Pondexter (15) || US Airways Center  11,590
|-
| 10:00 || Detroit || @ ||Seattle || NBA TVFSN-NW || 66-63DET || Smith (19) || Ford (8) || Nolan (7) || KeyArena  6,821
|-
| rowspan=3|Fri 17 || 7:00 || Atlanta || @ ||Indiana ||  || 84-79IND || Douglas (25) || de Souza (14) || Bevilaqua (5) || Conseco Fieldhouse  7,975
|- 
| 8:00 || Connecticut || @ ||San Antonio ||  || 72-64CON || Hammon (24) || Frazee, Young (9) || Jones, Whalen (5) || AT&T Center  9,524
|- 
| 10:00 || Seattle || @ ||Sacramento ||  || 69-56SEA || Bird (20) || Little (9) || Bird (6) || ARCO Arena  6,386
|-
| rowspan=2|Sat 18 || 7:00 || New York || @ ||Washington ||  || 68-67WAS || Harding (23) || Harding (7) || Moore (9) || Verizon Center  9,968
|- 
| 10:00 || Detroit || @ ||Phoenix ||  || 97-90 (OT)PHO || Pondexter (26) || McWilliams (12) || Pondexter (8) || US Airways Center  8,288
|- 
| rowspan=5|Sun 19 || 3:00 || Indiana || @ ||Connecticut ||  || 67-61CON || Douglas, Hoffman, Whalen (15) || Gruda (9) || Whalen (6) || Mohegan Sun Arena  6,517
|- 
| 4:00 || Atlanta || @ ||New York ||  || 89-86NYL || Christon (32) || de Souza (10) || Mitchell (6) || Madison Square Garden  8,560
|- 
| 6:00 || San Antonio || @ ||Chicago || NBA TVCN100 || 85-75CHI || Perkins (29) || Dupree (11) || Canty (6) || UIC Pavilion  3,282
|-
| 8:00 || Minnesota || @ ||Seattle ||  || 72-69SEA || Little (18) || Anosike (11) || Bird, Johnson, Wright (4) || KeyArena  6,912
|-
| 9:00 || Detroit || @ ||Sacramento ||  || 69-65DET || McWilliams (21) || McWilliams (12) || 5 players (3) || ARCO Arena  7,538
|-
| rowspan=1|Tue 21 || 7:00 || Indiana || @ ||Washington ||  || 82-70IND || Catchings (28) || Catchings (10) || Bevilaqua (8) || Verizon Center  9,798
|- 
| rowspan=5|Wed 22 || 12:00 || Atlanta || @ ||Detroit || || 98-95 (OT)ATL || Braxton (25) || Braxton, Snow (12) || Nolan (9) || Palace of Auburn Hills  14,439
|- 
| 12:30 || New York || @ ||Chicago ||  || 77-70NYL || Fowles, Spencer (15) || Dupree (11) || Canty, Moore (4) || UIC Pavilion  5,881
|- 
| 7:00 || Sacramento || @ ||Connecticut ||  || 83-75CON || Jones (28) || Harper (11) || Phillips (7) || Mohegan Sun Arena  5,675
|-
| 10:00 || Minnesota || @ ||Phoenix ||  || 99-86MIN || Pondexter (28) || Bonner (10) || Johnson (6) || US Airways Center  7,360
|-
| 10:00 || Los Angeles || @ ||Seattle ||  || 98-87 (3OT)SEA || Bird (23) || Little (14) || Bird, Cash (5) || KeyArena  7,154
|-
| rowspan=3|Thu 23 || 12:30 || Indiana || @ ||San Antonio ||  || 84-65SAN || Young (24) || Frazee (8) || January (6) || AT&T Center  9,985
|- 
| 7:00 || Chicago || @ ||Washington || ESPN2 (HD) || 75-64WAS || Langhorne (16) || Langhorne (10) || Harding (6) || Verizon Center  11,651
|- 
| 7:30 || Sacramento || @ ||New York || MSG || 88-74SAC || Powell (32) || Powell, Walker (9) || Penicheiro (9) || Madison Square Garden  8,845
|-
| rowspan=1 style="background:#FAFAD2"|Sat 25 ||style="background:#FAFAD2"| 3:30 || style="background:#FAFAD2"|West All-Stars || style="background:#FAFAD2"|@ || style="background:#FAFAD2"|East All-Stars || style="background:#FAFAD2"|ABC (HD) ||style="background:#FAFAD2"| 130-118WEST ||style="background:#FAFAD2"| Cash (22) ||style="background:#FAFAD2"| de Souza, Pondexter (9) ||style="background:#FAFAD2"| Bird (10) ||style="background:#FAFAD2"| Mohegan Sun Arena  9,518
|-
| rowspan=2|Sun 26 || 4:00 || Phoenix || @ || New York ||  || 94-88PHO || Taurasi (34) || Taurasi (13) || Johnson (7) || Madison Square Garden  11,211
|- 
| 4:00 || Sacramento || @ ||Washington ||  || 87-73WAS || Langhorne (19) || Langhorne (8) || Beard (5) || Verizon Center  10,757
|- 
| rowspan=4|Tue 28 || 7:00 || Washington || @ ||Indiana ||  || 85-81IND || Douglas (34) || Hoffman (10) || Harding, Melvin (4) || Conseco Fieldhouse  5,904
|- 
| 7:30 || Phoenix || @ ||Connecticut || ESPN2 (HD) || 95-80PHO || Pondexter (29) || T. Smith, Taurasi (9) || Johnson (7) || Mohegan Sun Arena  7,732
|- 
| 8:00 || Seattle || @ ||San Antonio || KMYS  || 74-71SAN || Hammon (24) || Cash (11) || Bird (5) || AT&T Center  5,382
|-
| 8:00 || Los Angeles || @ ||Minnesota ||  || 76-70LAS || Thompson (30) || Parker (10) || Hodges, Lennox, Thompson (4) || Target Center  7,216
|-
| rowspan=1|Wed 29 || 8:00 || Los Angeles || @ ||Chicago || || 75-63CHI || Perkins (18) || Parker (10) || Dupree (5) || UIC Pavilion  5,633
|- 
| rowspan=4|Thu 30 || 2:30 || San Antonio || @ ||Sacramento ||  || 101-93 (OT)SAC || Hammon (38) || Young (11) || Penicheiro (9) || ARCO Arena  10,461
|- 
| 7:00 || Connecticut || @ ||Indiana || FSI || 94-85 (OT)IND || Douglas (32) || Gruda (10) || Bevilaqua (4) || Conseco Fieldhouse  6,538
|- 
| 7:30 || Washington || @ ||New York || NBA TVMSG || 78-75WAS || Beard, McCarville (28) || Langhorne (11) || Harding (4) || Madison Square Garden  10,172
|-
| 7:30 || Phoenix || @ ||Atlanta ||  || 106-76ATL || McCoughtry (17) || de Souza (14) || Lehning (5) || Philips Arena  7,827
|-
| rowspan=1|Fri 31 || 7:30 || Minnesota || @ ||Detroit ||  || 91-83DET || Nolan (22) || Ford (9) || McWilliams, Nolan (6) || Palace of Auburn Hills  9,314
|-

|- 
| rowspan=5|Sat 1 || 7:00 || New York || @ ||Atlanta || NBA TVMSG || 89-83ATL || Christon (23) || Carson, Christon (8) || McCarville (6) || Philips Arena  6,103
|- 
| 8:00 || Phoenix || @ ||Minnesota ||  || 87-74PHO || Taurasi (20) || Anosike (10) || Anosike, Willingham (5) || Target Center  6,631
|- 
| 8:00 || Connecticut || @ ||Chicago || NBA TVWCTX || 84-72CHI || Dupree (23) || Dupree (8) || Canty, Jēkabsone-Žogota (6) || UIC Pavilion  3,071
|-
| 10:00 || Los Angeles || @ ||Sacramento ||  || 59-56LAS || Powell (18) || Parker (12) || Penicheiro (8) || ARCO Arena  7,204
|-
| 10:00 || San Antonio || @ ||Seattle || NBA TVKMYS || 85-82 (OT)SEA || Jackson (23) || Jackson (13) || Bird (5) || KeyArena  8,167
|- 
| rowspan=2|Sun 2 || 4:00 || Indiana || @ ||Washington ||  || 87-79IND || Douglas (24) || Catchings (9) || Catchings (5) || Verizon Center  11,595
|- 
| 6:00 || Connecticut || @ ||Detroit ||  || 83-65CON || Whalen (22) || Ford (9) || Nolan, Whalen (4) || Palace of Auburn Hills  7,814
|- 
| rowspan=3|Tue 4 || 3:00 || San Antonio || @ ||Los Angeles ||  || 63-59SAN || Hammon (20) || Thompson (12) || Hammon (5) || Staples Center  13,865
|- 
| 7:30 || New York || @ ||Detroit || ESPN2 (HD) || 76-64DET || Nolan (26) || Nolan (14) || McWilliams, Nolan, Smith (4) || Palace of Auburn Hills  7,081
|- 
| 10:00 || Phoenix || @ ||Seattle ||  || 101-90 (OT)PHO || Wright (25) || Cash, Jackson (11) || T. Johnson, Wright (7) || KeyArena  6,728
|- 
| rowspan=1|Wed 5 || 7:00 || Chicago || @ ||Indiana || NBA TVCN100 || 76-67IND || Dupree (19) || Dupree (13) || Canty (4) || Conseco Fieldhouse  6,581
|- 
| rowspan=2|Thu 6 || 8:00 || Atlanta || @ ||San Antonio ||  || 92-84ATL || Hammon (26) || Lyttle (10) || Lehning (7) || AT&T Center  5,042
|- 
| 10:30 || Seattle || @ ||Los Angeles || || 79-75 (OT)LAS || Quinn (23) || Parker (13) || Bird, Wright (6) || Staples Center  9,735
|- 
| rowspan=3|Fri 7 || 7:00 || Detroit || @ ||Washington ||  || 70-66WAS || Beard (15) || Langhorne (9) || Nolan (6) || Verizon Center  10,637
|- 
| 8:00 || Connecticut || @ ||Minnesota || NBA TVFSN-N || 95-88MIN || Montgomery (24) || Anosike (12) || Jēkabsone-Žogota (7) || Target Center  8,134
|- 
| 10:00 || New York || @ ||Sacramento ||  || 84-66NYL || Paris (19) || Brunson (7) || McCarville (5) || ARCO Arena  6,284
|- 
| rowspan=3|Sat 8 || 7:00 || Chicago || @ ||Atlanta ||  || 82-80CHI || Thorn (20) || de Souza (15) || Perkins (5) || Philips Arena  5,424
|- 
| 10:00 || Indiana || @ ||Phoenix || || 90-83IND || Douglas (28) || Douglas (10) || Swanier (6) || US Airways Center  9,867
|- 
| 10:00 || New York || @ ||Seattle ||  || 70-69SEA || McCarville (22) || Christon, Jackson (9) || Bird (6) || KeyArena  7,496
|- 
| rowspan=3|Sun 9 || 3:00 || Washington || @ ||Connecticut ||  || 96-67CON || Beard (18) || Holt (8) || Beard (6) || Mohegan Sun Arena  6,528
|- 
| 6:00 || Chicago || @ ||Detroit || || 64-58DET || Zellous (19) || Fowles (18) || Smith (4) || Palace of Auburn Hills  6,893
|- 
| 6:00 || San Antonio || @ ||Minnesota ||  || 89-87SAN || Anosike (24) || Hodges, Hollingsworth (8) || Hammon (9) || Target Center  7,764
|- 
| rowspan=1|Mon 10 || 10:30 || Indiana || @ ||Los Angeles ||  || 75-63LAS || Leslie (21) || Leslie (11) || Milton-Jones (4) || Staples Center  8,263
|- 
| rowspan=3|Tue 11 || 7:00 || Detroit || @ ||Washington ||  || 81-77DET || Nolan (23) || McWilliams (13) || Harding (8) || Verizon Center  10,398
|- 
| 8:00 || Sacramento || @ ||San Antonio || || 90-73SAC || Brunson (19) || Brunson (9) || Penicheiro (11) || AT&T Center  4,961
|- 
| 9:00 || New York || @ ||Los Angeles || ESPN2 (HD) || 65-61NYL || Leslie (12) || Parker (11) || Christon, Moore (5) || Staples Center  9,548
|- 
| rowspan=4|Thu 13 || 7:00 || Seattle || @ ||Connecticut ||  || 64-53CON || Gruda (14) || Jackson, Jones (10) || Whalen (7) || Mohegan Sun Arena  6,983
|- 
| 7:30 || Detroit || @ ||Atlanta || || 80-75ATL || Nolan (20) || de Souza (13) || Lehning, McWilliams (5) || Philips Arena  5,641
|- 
| 8:00 || Indiana || @ ||Minnesota ||  || 91-81IND || Hoffman (24) || Anosike (16) || Bevilaqua, Dixon (4) || Target Center  7,156
|- 
| 10:00 || San Antonio || @ ||Phoenix ||  || 95-83PHO || Tauarsi, Young (29) || Wauters (10) || Hammon (8) || US Airways Center  6,522
|- 
| rowspan=3|Fri 14 || 7:00 || Connecticut || @ ||Washington ||  || 91-89 (2OT)WAS || Beard (26) || Langhorne (16) || Whalen (5) || Verizon Center  9,738
|- 
| 7:30 || Chicago || @ ||New York || NBA TVCN100MSG || 88-77CHI || Christon (25) || Christon (10) || Canty, Moore (6) || Madison Square Garden  9,832
|- 
| 10:30 || Sacramento || @ ||Los Angeles || || 85-79SAC || Leslie (25) || Parker (10) || Penicheiro (10) || Staples Center  10,122
|- 
| rowspan=5|Sat 15 || 7:00 || Detroit || @ ||Indiana ||  || 82-59IND || Douglas (19) || Braxton (10) || Douglas (4) || Conseco Fieldhouse  9,963
|- 
| 7:00 || Seattle || @ ||Atlanta ||  || 88-79ATL || Jackson (25) || de Souza (12) || Bird (12) || Philips Arena  8,751
|- 
| 8:00 || Phoenix || @ ||San Antonio || NBA TVKMYSFSNA || 106-89SAN || Young (25) || Young (7) || Hammon (6) || AT&T Center  8,933
|-
| 8:00 || Minnesota || @ ||Chicago ||  || 79-76CHI || Hodges (25) || Dupree (14) || Canty (8) || UIC Pavilion  3,877
|-
| 10:00 || Los Angeles || @ ||Sacramento ||  || 78-61LAS || Powell (20) || Brunson (11) || Walker (5) || ARCO Arena  7,646
|- 
| rowspan=1|Sun 16 || 4:00 || New York || @ ||Washington ||  || 60-59NYL || McCarville (19) || Langhorne (8) || Harding (7) || Verizon Center  10,580
|- 
| rowspan=3|Tue 18 || 7:30 || Seattle || @ ||Detroit ||  || 79-75SEA || Jackson (36) || McWilliams (8) || Bird (8) || Palace of Auburn Hills  7,392
|- 
| 8:00 || Phoenix || @ ||Chicago || || 106-99PHO || Taurasi (27) || Bonner (10) || Taurasi (7) || UIC Pavilion  TBA
|- 
| 10:30 || Washington || @ ||Los Angeles || || 72-69LAS || Leslie (20) || Parker (12) || Parker, Quinn (5) || Staples Center  9,287
|- 
| rowspan=2|Wed 19 || 7:00 || New York || @ ||Connecticut ||  || 74-69CON || Whalen (20) || Whalen (10) || White (6) || Mohegan Sun Arena  6,050
|-
| 10:30 || Minnesota || @ ||Los Angeles ||  || 78-63LAS || Leslie (20) || Parker (10) || Quinn (7) || Staples Center  9,181
|- 
| rowspan=2|Thu 20 || 7:30 || San Antonio || @ ||Atlanta ||  || 93-87ATL || McCoughtry (34) || de Souza (11) || Lehning (6) || Philips Arena  5,848
|- 
| 10:00 || Indiana || @ ||Sacramento || || 67-62SAC || Douglas (21) || Brunson, Powell (10) || January, Penicheiro (6) || ARCO Arena  6,290
|- 
| rowspan=3|Fri 21 || 7:30 || Connecticut || @ ||New York || NBA TVMSG || 85-83 (OT)NYL || Gruda (24) || McCarville (13) || Whalen (7) || Madison Square Garden  9,355
|- 
| 8:00 || Los Angeles || @ ||San Antonio || NBA TVKMYS || 67-66 (OT)LAS || Young (31) || Parker, Thompson (12) || Hammon (6) || AT&T Center  9,540
|- 
| 10:00 || Washington || @ ||Phoenix || || 91-81WAS || Langhorne (19) || Langhorne (12) || Harding, Pondexter (6) || US Airways Center  9,155
|- 
| rowspan=4|Sat 22 || 7:00 || Minnesota || @ ||Connecticut ||  || 98-94CON || Gruda, Humphrey, Whalen, Wiggins (21) || Gruda (9) || Whalen (8) || Mohegan Sun Arena  7,803
|- 
| 8:00 || Detroit || @ ||Chicago || || 76-67DET || Dupree (20) || Dupree (14) || 4 players (4) || UIC Pavilion  5,167
|- 
| 10:00 || Washington || @ ||Sacramento || || 82-60SAC || Powell (26) || Powell (11) || Penicheiro (5) || ARCO Arena  7,067
|- 
| 10:00 || Indiana || @ ||Seattle || || 74-60SEA || Bird (16) || Cash (9) || Catchings (7) || KeyArena  8,273
|- 
| rowspan=3|Sun 23 || 3:00 || Los Angeles || @ ||Atlanta ||  || 91-87LAS || Castro Marques (26) || de Souza (9) || Thompson (6) || Philips Arena  11,304
|- 
| 4:00 || Minnesota || @ ||New York || || 80-67NYL || Christon (24) || Jackson, Wiggins (7) || Moore (6) || Madison Square Garden  8,481
|- 
| 6:00 || San Antonio || @ ||Detroit || || 99-84DET || Smith (31) || McWilliams, Nolan (7) || Hornbuckle (7) || Palace of Auburn Hills  7,130
|- 
| rowspan=4|Tue 25 || 7:00 || Detroit || @ ||Connecticut ||  || 90-70DET || Gruda, Smith (19) || Kelly (8) || Whalen (8) || Mohegan Sun Arena  6,811
|- 
| 7:30 || Sacramento || @ ||Atlanta || || 103-83ATL || Castro Marques (30) || Lyttle (9) || Penicheiro (11) || Philips Arena  5,159
|- 
| 10:00 || Chicago || @ ||Los Angeles || ESPN2 (HD) || 75-63LAS || Leslie, Parker (21) || Parker (12) || Canty (4) || Staples Center  9,615
|- 
| 10:00 || Washington || @ ||Seattle || || 78-68SEA || Burse (14) || Little (7) || Wright (6) || KeyArena  6,791
|- 
| rowspan=4|Thu 27 || 7:00 || San Antonio || @ ||Indiana || NBA TVFSI || 77-66IND || Catchings (20) || Wauter (14) || Hammon (6) || Conseco Fieldhouse  6,836
|- 
| 7:30 || Atlanta || @ ||Detroit || || 87-83DET || Nolan (29) || de Souza (13) || McCoughtry (5) || Palace of Auburn Hills  5,695
|- 
| 10:00 || Connecticut || @ ||Seattle ||  || 86-74SEA || Bird (21) || Little (10) || Bird (7) || KeyArena  6,588
|- 
| 10:30 || Phoenix || @ ||Los Angeles || NBA TVFSNW || 98-90PHO || Pondexter (26) || Bonner (9) || Quinn (8) || Staples Center  9,586
|- 
| rowspan=2|Fri 28 || 8:00 || Sacramento || @ ||Minnesota ||  || 100-95MIN || Maiga-Ba (20) || Brunson (9) || Powell (6) || Target Center  8,782
|- 
| 8:30 || New York || @ ||Chicago || NBA TVMSGCN100 || 96-77CHI || Dupree (26) || Vaughn (9) || Christon (6) || UIC Pavilion  3,707
|- 
| rowspan=4|Sat 29 || 3:00 || Detroit || @ ||San Antonio || ESPN2 (HD) || 100-88 (OT)SAN || Nolan (34) || Wauters (11) || Hammon (9) || AT&T Center  7,735
|- 
| 7:00 || Sacramento || @ ||Indiana || || 79-78SAC || Douglas (24) || Powell (11) || Bevilaqua (6) || Conseco Fieldhouse  8,579
|- 
| 10:00 || Connecticut || @ ||Phoenix || NBA TVWCTX || 95-84PHO || Jēkabsone-Žogota (23) || Gardin (13) || Taurasi (5) || US Airways Center  9,977
|- 
| 10:00 || Atlanta || @ ||Seattle || || 91-84 (2OT)SEA || Wright (25) || Little (15) || Bird (8) || KeyArena  9,089
|- 
| rowspan=3|Sun 30 || 4:00 || Chicago || @ ||New York ||  || 77-63NYL || Christon (18) || Dupree, Kraayeveld (13) || Thorn (7) || Madison Square Garden  8,685
|- 
| 4:00 || Minnesota || @ ||Washington || || 81-75WAS || Houston (20) || Langhorne (10) || Harding (5) || Verizon Center  12,241
|- 
| 9:30 || Connecticut || @ ||Los Angeles || NBA TVFSNW || 91-81LAS || Jēkabsone-Žogota, Thompson (21) || Parker (13) || Whalen (9) || Staples Center  11,072
|-

|- 
| rowspan=5|Tue 1 || 7:30 || Seattle || @ ||New York ||  || 65-58SEA || Little (17) || Little (13) || Moore (4) || Madison Square Garden  8,469
|- 
| 7:30 || Phoenix || @ ||Detroit ||  || 101-99DET || Pondexter (25) || Ford (11) || Taurasi (6) || Palace of Auburn Hills  5,239
|- 
| 8:00 || Minnesota || @ ||San Antonio ||  || 84-82 (2OT)SAN || Hammon (29) || Anosike (11) || Hammon (5) || AT&T Center  4,881
|-
| 10:00 || Connecticut || @ ||Sacramento ||  || 90-70SAC || Brunson (32) || Brunson (13) || Powell (7) || ARCO Arena  6,015
|-
| 10:30 || Atlanta || @ ||Los Angeles ||  || 84-79ATL || Castro Marques (27) || Parker (14) || Lennox (5) || Staples Center  8,756
|- 
| rowspan=1|Wed 2 || 7:00 || Phoenix || @ ||Indiana || NBA TVFSI || 106-90PHO || Catchings (27) || Catchings (12) || Johnson (6) || Conseco Fieldhouse  7,446
|- 
| rowspan=1|Thu 3 || 7:00 || Seattle || @ ||Washington ||  || 78-67WAS || Bird, Currie (17) || Langhorne (11) || Bird (6) || Verizon Center  10,648
|- 
| rowspan=4|Fri 4 || 7:00 || New York || @ ||Connecticut || NBA TVMSG || 88-85 (OT)CON || Jēkabsone-Žogota (23) || Moore (8) || Whalen (7) || Mohegan Sun Arena  6,685
|- 
| 7:30 || Indiana || @ ||Detroit ||  || 70-63 (OT)DET || Nolan (22) || Catchings (13) || Nolan (4) || Palace of Auburn Hills  7,230
|- 
| 8:30 || Washington || @ ||Chicago ||  || 92-86CHI || Ajavon (32) || Dupree, Langhorne (10) || Harding, Perkins (5) || UIC Pavilion  3,241
|-
| 10:00 || Atlanta || @ ||Sacramento ||  || 98-90ATL || de Souza (27) || de Souza (13) || McCoughtry (10) || ARCO Arena  6,517
|- 
| rowspan=3|Sat 5 || 8:00 || Los Angeles || @ ||San Antonio ||  || 89-72SAN || Johnson (27) || Parker (10) || Lawson-Wade (11) || AT&T Center  8,631
|- 
| 8:00 || Seattle || @ ||Minnesota || NBA TVFSN-N || 76-68MIN || Houston (22) || Little (8) || Houston, Johnson, Wright (4) || Target Center  8,170
|- 
| 10:00 || Atlanta || @ ||Phoenix ||  || 100-82PHO || de Souza (23) || Bonner, Snow (7) || Lehning (10) || US Airways Center  10,424
|- 
| rowspan=2|Sun 6 || 4:00 || Washington || @ ||Indiana ||  || 72-61IND || Catchings (20) || Sutton-Brown (11) || Hoffman (4) || Conseco Fieldhouse  9,702
|- 
| 6:00 || Chicago || @ ||Detroit ||  || 84-75DET || Nolan (19) || Ely, Nolan (8) || Braxton, Hornbuckle, Nolan (4) || Palace of Auburn Hills  6,619
|- 
| rowspan=2|Tue 8 || 7:30 || Indiana || @ ||New York ||  || 69-63IND || Carson, Catchings, Douglas (17) || Catchings (10) || Mitchell (6) || Madison Square Garden  7,583
|- 
| 10:30 || San Antonio || @ ||Los Angeles || NBA TVKMYS || 76-68LAS || Leslie (18) || Parker (13) || Hammon (7) || Staples Center  10,476
|- 
| rowspan=1|Wed 9 || 8:00 || Detroit || @ ||Minnesota ||  || 75-72MIN || Ford (16) || Ford (12) || Ford, Teasley, Zellous (4) || Target Center  7,423
|- 
| rowspan=4|Thu 10 || 7:30 || New York || @ ||Detroit || NBA TVMSG || 94-87 (OT)DET || Nolan (34) || Braxton, McWilliams (8) || Moore (6) || Palace of Auburn Hills  8,178
|- 
| 8:00 || Indiana || @ ||Chicago ||  || 86-79CHI || Douglas (25) || Catchings (10) || Canty (6) || UIC Pavilion  2,902
|- 
| 10:00 || San Antonio || @ ||Sacramento ||  || 80-71SAN || Hammon (27) || Powell (10) || Johnson, Lawson-Wade, Penicheiro (5) || ARCO Arena  7,566
|-
| 10:00 || Phoenix || @ ||Seattle ||  || 92-84 (OT)PHO || Wright (24) || Burse, Little (9) || Pondexter (8) || KeyArena  9,089
|- 
| rowspan=2|Fri 11 || 7:00 || Connecticut || @ ||Atlanta ||  || 88-64ATL || McCoughtry (18) || de Souza (14) || Lyttle (5) || Philips Arena  8,644
|- 
| 10:30 || Minnesota || @ ||Los Angeles || NBA TVFSNW || 90-61LAS || Leslie, Thompson (19) || Parker (14) || Quinn (9) || Staples Center  13,764
|- 
| rowspan=3|Sat 12 || 7:00 || Atlanta || @ ||Washington ||  || 82-64WAS || Harding (25) || McCoughtry (13) || Currie (5) || Verizon Center  11,987
|- 
| 8:00 || Seattle || @ ||San Antonio ||  || 64-55SEA || S. Johnson (16) || Little, Perperoglou (11) || Darling (5) || AT&T Center  10,153
|- 
| 8:00 || Detroit || @ ||Chicago ||  || 80-69DET || Dupree (27) || McWilliams (10) || Canty (6) || UIC Pavilion  5,334
|- 
| rowspan=4|Sun 13 || 3:00 || Los Angeles || @ ||Phoenix || ESPN2 (HD) || 81-78LAS || Parker (24) || Parker (14) || Lennox (6) || US Airways Center  12,968
|- 
| 3:00 || Indiana || @ ||Connecticut || WCTX || 95-85CON || Gardin (23) || Gardin (8) || Phillips, Wirth (7) || Mohegan Sun Arena  9,047
|- 
| 4:00 || Washington || @ ||New York || MSG || 86-65NYL || Carson, Currie (17) || Ajavon (9) || Mitchell (6) || Madison Square Garden  15,667
|-
| 9:00 || Minnesota || @ ||Sacramento ||  || 88-66SAC || Powell (27) || Paris (14) || Penicheiro (10) || ARCO Arena  10,212
|-

|-
! style="background:#094480; color:white" | 2009 WNBA Postseason
|-

|-
| rowspan=2|Wed 16 || 8:00 || Atlanta || @ || Detroit || ESPN2 (HD) || 94-89DET || Castro Marques, Nolan (25) || Ford (10) || Castro Marques (7) || Palace of Auburn Hills  6,122
|- 
| 10:00 || Seattle || @ || Los Angeles || ESPN2 (HD) || 70-63LAS || Cash (24) || Leslie, Parker (10) || Bird, Harrower, Wright (5) || Staples Center  7,919
|-
| rowspan=2|Thu 17 || 8:00 || Indiana || @ || Washington || ESPN2 (HD) || 88-79IND || Catchings (26) || Catchings (12) || Melvin (4) || Comcast Center  6,332
|- 
| 10:00 || Phoenix || @ || San Antonio || ESPN2 (HD) || 92-91SAN || Young (24) || Wauters (11) || V. Johnson (8) || AT&T Center  5,721
|-
| rowspan=2|Fri 18 || 7:30 || Detroit || @ || Atlanta || NBA TV || 94-79DET || Nolan (22) || Braxton, Hornbuckle (8) || Braxton, Nolan (5) || Gwinnett Center  4,780
|- 
| 10:00 || Los Angeles || @ || Seattle || NBA TV || 75-74SEA || Cash (18) || Leslie (14) || Wright (9) || KeyArena  8,854
|-
| rowspan=2|Sat 19 || 7:00 || Washington || @ || Indiana || NBA TV || 81-74 (OT)IND || Catchings (24) || Catchings (16) || Catchings, Douglas, Harding (5) || Conseco Fieldhouse  9,655
|- 
| 10:00 || San Antonio || @ || Phoenix || NBA TV || 106-78PHO || Taurasi (24) || Bonner (13) || Taurasi (5) || US Airways Center  7,267
|- 
| rowspan=1|Sun 20 || 5:00 || Los Angeles || @ || Seattle || ESPN2 (HD) || 75-64LAS || Parker (22) || Cash (10) || Quinn (7) || KeyArena  8,159
|- 
| rowspan=1|Mon 21 || 10:00 || San Antonio || @ || Phoenix || ESPN2 (HD) || 100-92PHO || Taurasi (30) || T. Smith, Young (8) || Taurasi (6) || US Airways Center  6,896
|-

|-
| rowspan=2|Wed 23 || 8:00 || Indiana || @ || Detroit || ESPN2 (HD) || 72-56DET || Zellous (23) || Catchings (11) || Bevilaqua, Douglas, Zellous (5) || Palace of Auburn Hills  7,214
|- 
| 10:00 || Phoenix || @ || Los Angeles || ESPN2 (HD) || 103-94PHO || Parker, Taurasi (28) || Parker (10) || Taurasi (6) || Pauley Pavilion  6,389
|-
| rowspan=2|Fri 25 || 7:00 || Detroit || @ || Indiana || NBA TV || 79-75IND || Nolan (23) || Ford (13) || Catchings (5) || Conseco Fieldhouse  9,210
|- 
| 10:00 || Los Angeles || @ || Phoenix || NBA TV || 87-76LAS || Taurasi (25) || Parker (18) || Taylor (5) || US Airways Center  7,628
|-
| rowspan=2|Sat 26 || 7:00 || Detroit || @ || Indiana || NBA TV || 72-67IND || Sutton-Brown (17) || Ford (11) || Catchings (5) || Conseco Fieldhouse  18,165
|- 
| 10:00 || Los Angeles || @ || Phoenix || NBA TV || 85-74 || Leslie (22) || Thompson (11) || Taylor (4) || US Airways Center  7,226
|-

|-
| Tue 29 || 9:00 || Indiana || @ || Phoenix || ESPN2 (HD) || 120-116 (OT)PHO || Douglas (20) || Taurasi (9) || January (7) || US Airways Center  11,617
|-
| Thu 1 || 9:00 || Indiana || @ || Phoenix || ESPN2 (HD) || 93-84IND || Taurasi (20) || Catchings (9) || Catchings (11) || US Airways Center  16,758
|-
| Sun 4 || 4:00 || Phoenix || @ || Indiana || ESPN2 (HD) || 86-85IND || Pondexter (23) || Catchings (12) || Pondexter (8) || Conseco Fieldhouse  18,165
|-
| Wed 7 || 7:30 || Phoenix || @ || Indiana || ESPN2 (HD) || 90-77PHO || Catchings (24) || Catchings (12) || Pondexter (7) || Conseco Fieldhouse  18,165
|-
| Fri 9 || 9:00 || Indiana || @ || Phoenix || ESPN2 (HD) || 94-86PHO || Taurasi (26) || Catchings (9) || Douglas (9) || US Airways Center  17,313
|-

Playoffs and Finals

2009 WNBA season summary

Season highlights
On June 15, 2009, only three games into the Detroit Shock season, seven-year head coach and general manager Bill Laimbeer announced his resignation. Rick Mahorn was promoted to head coach, and Cheryl Reeve took over GM duties.
On July 5, 2009, reigning MVP Candace Parker returned to the court for the first time since giving birth just 53 days earlier.
On July 12, 2009, Sacramento Monarchs general manager John Whisenant announced that head coach Jenny Boucek would be relieved of her duties after a 3-10 start to the season. Whisenant took over the position while maintaining his GM duties.
On July 31, 2009, New York Liberty general manager Carol Blazejowski announced that Pat Coyle would be fired as the head coach after a 6-11 start to the season. Assistant coach Anne Donovan took over the job on an interim basis.
On August 10, 2009, Los Angeles Sparks center Lisa Leslie recorded her 6,000th career point in her team's win against the Indiana Fever. Leslie was the first player in WNBA history to reach the 6,000 point plateau.
On August 15, 2009, Seattle Storm forward Lauren Jackson recorded her 5,000th career point in her team's loss against the Atlanta Dream. Jackson was the fourth player to reach the 5,000 point plateau; she was, however, the fastest and the youngest to do so.
On August 17, the Chicago Sky announced a change of home venue, effective with the 2010 season. The team would abandon their original home of UIC Pavilion on the campus of the University of Illinois at Chicago and move to Allstate Arena in suburban Rosemont.
The Phoenix Mercury averaged a league-best (and highest in WNBA history) 92.8 points per game. Fixed for a 48-minute game (111.4 points per game), the Mercury's average surpassed the highest scoring team in the WNBA.
The Phoenix Mercury shot 85.5% from the free-throw line. This clip is the best team free-throw percentage in WNBA and NBA history.
On September 25, 2009, NBA legend Larry Bird purchased about 9,000 balcony tickets to the Indiana Fever vs. Detroit Shock game three of the Eastern Conference Finals. The tickets were then distributed at the Fever box office free-of-charge to fans. Bird had the sole intent of filling the arena to support the Fever, who had never advanced to the WNBA Finals. Announced attendance at the game was 18,165 and the Fever beat the Shock.
On September 28, 2009, Phoenix Suns general manager Steve Kerr purchased about 7,000 balcony tickets to the Phoenix Mercury vs. Indiana Fever game one of the 2009 WNBA Finals. The tickets were then distributed at the Mercury box office free-of-charge to fans. Kerr wanted to follow up Bird's similar action stating that he knows how important a large crowd can be in a Finals series.

End-of-season business report
The WNBA's regular season on ESPN2 (13 telecasts) concluded with an average of 269,000 viewers, up 8% vs. 2008 season (248,000 viewers). In addition, regular-season games on ESPN2 saw increases in key demographics, including men 18-34 (+9%), men 18-49 (+14%) and men 23-54 (+23%).
Ratings and viewership for Game 1 of the WNBA Finals on ESPN2 were up 39 percent (.43 rating vs. .31 rating for Game 1 of the '08 WNBA Finals) and 59 percent respectively (555,000 viewers vs. 348,000 viewers), making Game 1 the most viewed WNBA game on cable since Game 4 of the '07 WNBA Finals (Shock vs. Mercury) on ESPN2 (669,000).

Retirements
On February 5, 2009, center Lisa Leslie of the Los Angeles Sparks announced that the 2009 season would be her last in the WNBA. Leslie was one of the four remaining players from the WNBA's inaugural season.
On May 15, 2009, forward Yolanda Griffith of the Indiana Fever announced that the 2009 season would be her last in the WNBA. Griffith was injured in the third game of the season but continued to help the Fever as an assistant coach figure.
On May 31, 2009, San Antonio Silver Stars guard Vickie Johnson announced that the 2009 season would be her last in the league. Johnson was one of the four remaining players from the WNBA's inaugural season.
On September 18, 2009, Seattle Storm guard Shannon "Pee Wee" Johnson announced that she would retire at the end of the 2009 season.
On September 24, 2009, forward Erin Perperoglou of the San Antonio Silver Stars announced that she would not return to the WNBA.

Season award winners

Player of the Week award

Postseason awards

Coaches

Eastern Conference
Atlanta Dream: Marynell Meadors 
Chicago Sky: Steven Key
Connecticut Sun: Mike Thibault
Detroit Shock: Bill Laimbeer and Rick Mahorn
Indiana Fever: Lin Dunn
New York Liberty: Pat Coyle and Anne Donovan
Washington Mystics: Julie Plank

Western Conference
Los Angeles Sparks: Michael Cooper 
Minnesota Lynx: Jennifer Gillom
Phoenix Mercury: Corey Gaines 
Sacramento Monarchs: Jenny Boucek and John Whisenant
San Antonio Silver Stars: Dan Hughes
Seattle Storm: Brian Agler

See also
WNBA
WNBA Draft
WNBA All-Star Game
WNBA Playoffs
WNBA Finals

References

External links
Comets To Cease Operations

 
2009 in American women's basketball
2008–09 in American basketball by league
2009–10 in American basketball by league
Women's National Basketball Association seasons